Ardmore Municipal Airport  is in Carter County, Oklahoma,  northeast of the city of Ardmore, which owns it. It is near Gene Autry, Oklahoma. The National Plan of Integrated Airport Systems for 2011–2015 called it a general aviation airport.

History 
The airport is on the site of Ardmore Army Air Field (1942 to 1946), later Ardmore Air Force Base (1953 to 1959).

Central Airlines served Ardmore from about 1951 until 1963.

On April 22, 1966 American Flyers Flight 280, flying a Lockheed Electra L-188 on approach to Ardmore crashed into a hill. 83 of the 98 aboard were killed. This was a flight under charter to the Military Air Command, en route from Montery, California, to Columbus, Georgia, with a scheduled refueling stop at Ardmore. An autopsy showed that the pilot had suffered a massive heart attack during the attempted landing. He was not wearing his harness and slumped forward into the controls, which prevented the co-pilot from taking control. Subsequent investigation showed that the pilot was under treatment for arteriosclerosis and diabetes, but that he had falsified information on his application for a First Class Medical Certificate, which would have been denied except for the falsification.

Facilities
Ardmore Municipal Airport covers 2,503 acres (1,013 ha) at an elevation of 777 feet (237 m). It has two runways: 13/31 is 9,002 by 150 feet (2,744 x 46 m) concrete and 17/35 is 5,007 by 100 feet (1,526 x 30 m) asphalt.

In the year ending July 2, 2009, the airport had 45,729 aircraft operations, average 125 per day: 80% general aviation and 20% military. 15 aircraft were then based at the airport: 40% single-engine, 13% multi-engine, and 47% jet.

The control tower is staffed under the federal contract tower program. The airport is staffed by the city of Ardmore.

Industries at the Airpark including King Aerospace, Higgins Interiors, Inc., Dollar General Distribution Center, East Jordan Iron Works, Carbonyx, Inc., and Online Packaging.

References

External links
  "Ardmore Army Air Field" (via Archive.org)
 Lakeland Aviation, Inc. (fixed-base operator for Ardmore Municipal Airport)
 
  
 Carter County water treatment constructed at airport (July 16, 2004, press release) 
 http://www.brightok.net/~gsimmons/
 
 

Airports in Oklahoma
Buildings and structures in Carter County, Oklahoma
Transport infrastructure completed in 1942